Ahonoora (1975–1989) was a British Thoroughbred racehorse and sire. In a career that lasted from 1977 to 1979 he ran sixteen times and won seven races. Ahonoora was a sprinter who specialised in races over five and six furlongs, with his most important wins coming in the Stewards's Cup at Goodwood and the Group Two William Hill Sprint Championship (now a Group One race) at York. He is primarily notable for his achievements at stud, where his progeny, including Dr Devious, Park Express and Indian Ridge, made him one of the most significant modern representatives of the Byerley Turk sire line.

Background

Ahonoora was bred in England by the Wyld Court Stud near the village of Hampstead Norreys in Berkshire and sold as a yearling for 7,600 guineas to Essa Alkhalifa.

His sire, Lorenzaccio was a high-class racehorse who won the July Stakes and the Prix Jean Prat in his early career, but was principally famous for his defeat of the Triple Crown winner Nijinsky as a five-year-old in the 1970 Champion Stakes.

Racing career
Ahonoora was sent into training with Brian Swift at Loretta Lodge, Epsom. As a three-year-old, Ahonoora recorded his first major win when he took the Strewards' Cup as a 50/1 outsider.

As a four-year-old, Ahonoora moved to the Fitzroy stable of Frankie Durr at Newmarket, Suffolk and made a successful transition from handicaps to Conditions races. In spring he finished second to Double Form in the Temple Stakes at Sandown and in June he was second again to the same horse in the King's Stand Stakes at Royal Ascot. He returned to Goodwood to win the Group Three King George Stakes in July. In August he recorded his most important success when he was awarded the William Hill Sprint Championship at York on the disqualification of Thatching. In September he finished second to Double Form for the third time in the Vernons Sprint Cup at Haydock.

Stud career
Ahonoora was retired to the Irish National Stud in 1980 at a fee of £2,250. He soon exceeded all expectations, and, despite his racing career as a pure sprinter, he proved capable of siring top class performers at a wide range of distances. Ahonoora proved to be one of the most successful and important representatives of the Byerley Turk line in the modern era. His notable winners include:
Park Appeal (1982)- Cheveley Park Stakes
Park Express (1983)- Irish Champion Stakes
Don't Forget Me (1984)- 2000 Guineas
Indian Ridge (1985)- King's Stand Stakes, leading sire of Compton Place, Domedriver, Indian Haven, Namid, Sleeping Indian, Linngari, Ridgewood Pearl and Indian Ink
Ruby Tiger (1987)- E. P. Taylor Stakes
 Dr Devious (1989)- Epsom Derby, sire of Collier Hill and Kinnaird.
Inchinor (1990)- sire of Notnowcato and Orientor

He is the damsire of:
 New Approach (2005)- Epsom Derby, sire of Dawn Approach
 Cape Cross (1994)- sire of Sea The Stars, Ouija Board, Golden Horn and Awtaad.
 Azeri (1998)- Breeders' Cup Distaff
 Leroidesanimaux (2000)- sire of Animal Kingdom
 Acclamation (1999) - sire of Dark Angel, Equiano, Marsha and Harbour Watch

In 1989, Ahonoora was bought by the Coolmore Stud. He was shuttled to stand in Australia for the southern hemisphere breeding season. He died after sustaining a broken hind leg in a paddock accident at Segenhoe Stud in the upper Hunter Region, Australia on 14 October 1989.

Pedigree

References

1975 racehorse births
1989 racehorse deaths
Thoroughbred family 1-m
Byerley Turk sire line